The South Carolina Department of Department of Alcohol and Other Drug Abuse Services (DAODAS) is a state agency in the state of South Carolina in the US.  The agency was formed in 1957 as the South Carolina Alcoholic Rehabilitation Center, through the state general assembly passing Act 309. Later it broadened to cover substance abuse in 1993. The department contracts with the state’s county alcohol and drug abuse authorities to provide the majority of direct prevention, treatment and recovery services. The department is composed of five divisions: Prevention and Intervention Services, Treatment and Recovery Services, Technology, Research and Evaluation, Legal and Compliance, and Finance and Operations.

South Carolina Department of Department of Alcohol and Other Drug Abuse Services is a cabinet level agency of the state of South Carolina; its Director is appointed by the Governor. The current director is Sara Goldsby. The Department coordinates with state universities and the stakeholders to fight addiction and has also leveraged technology in prisons to improve mental health outcomes.

References

External links
 
 State of South Carolina Official Web Site

Department of Alcohol and Other Drug Abuse Services